Romania competed at the 2018 Winter Olympics in Pyeongchang, South Korea, from 9 to 25 February 2018, with 27 competitors in 8 sports.

Competitors
The following is the list of number of competitors participating at the Games per sport/discipline.

Alpine skiing 

Romania qualified two athletes, one male and one female.

Biathlon 

Based on their Nations Cup ranking in the 2016–17 Biathlon World Cup, Romania has qualified 5 men.

Bobsleigh 

Based on their rankings in the 2017–18 Bobsleigh World Cup, Romania has qualified 2 sleds. 

* – Denotes the driver of each sled

Cross-country skiing 

Romania qualified three athletes, two male and one female.

Distance

Sprint

Luge 

Based on the results from the World Cups during the 2017–18 Luge World Cup season, Romania qualified 4 sleds.

Mixed team relay

Skeleton 

Romania qualified two sleds, one in the male disciplined in one in the female discipline. Both athletes and also previously represented Romania in the Olympic Games.

Ski jumping

Speed skating

References

Nations at the 2018 Winter Olympics
2018
Winter Olympics